Goodenia benthamiana, commonly known as small-leaf goodenia, is a species of flowering plant in the family Goodeniaceae and is endemic to south-eastern Australia. It is an aromatic undershrub with stem-clasping, egg-shaped to elliptic leaves with toothed edges, and yellow flowers arranged singly or in groups of up to three in leaf axils, with leaf-like bracteoles at the base.

Description

Taxonomy and naming
Small-leaf goodenia was first formally described in 1868 by George Bentham as Goodenia amplexans var. parvifolia in Flora Australiensis from specimens collected by John Dallachy on Mount Arapiles. In 1992, Roger Charles Carolin raised the variety to species status as G. benthamiana in Flora of Australia. The specific epithet (benthamiana) honours George Bentham.

Distribution and habitat
Goodenia benthamiana grows in forest, woodland and mallee scrubland in scattered areas of western Victoria and on the Eyre Peninsula in South Australia.

References

benthamiana
Flora of South Australia
Flora of Victoria (Australia)
Plants described in 1992
Taxa named by Roger Charles Carolin